The men's doubles of the 2005 ECM Prague Open tournament was played on clay in Prague, Czech Republic.

Jordan Kerr and Sebastián Prieto won the title by defeating Travis Parrott and Rogier Wassen 6–4, 6–3 in the final.

Seeds

Draw

Draw

References

External links
 ITF tournament profile
 Main draw (ATP)
 Qualifying draw (ATP)

2005 Men's Doubles